Mount Erin is a small town in the Mid West region of Western Australia.

References

Mid West (Western Australia)
Towns in Western Australia